The American Competitiveness Initiative (ACI) is a federal assistance program intended to help America maintain its competitiveness through investment in research and development (R&D) and education.  The ACI’s focus is on programs that are likely to strengthen U.S. competitiveness by targeting funding to agencies that support research in the physical sciences.  NASA, however, is not included in the ACI.

In partnership with the private sector, state and local governments, and colleges and universities, the ACI hopes to promote new levels of educational achievement and economic productivity.

Background 
In October 2005, the National Academies of Science released a report that revealed how U.S. technological leadership and export are currently under threat. As an example, the report cited that out of the 120 chemical plants built around the world worth $1 billion or more, one is constructed in the United States but 50 are in China. The organization stressed that "the scientific and technical building blocks of our economic leadership are eroding at a time when many other nations are gathering strength." Three months after the publication of the report, ACI was announced in President George W. Bush’s State of the Union Address given on January 31, 2006.  In his statement, the President said: "Our greatest advantage in the world has always been our educated, hard-working, ambitious people - and we are going to keep that edge."

The Initiative committed $5.9 billion ($1.3 billion in new Federal funding, and an additional $4.6 billion in R&D tax incentives) in FY 2007 to increase investments in R&D, strengthen education, and encourage entrepreneurship.  Over ten years, the Initiative plans to commit $50 billion to increase funding for research and $86 billion for R&D tax incentives. Key programs under the ACI include:

 more rigorous math courses with new programs for elementary and middle school students and research-based instruction;
 in-service development of new Advanced Placement and International Baccalaureate teachers in schools that serve low-income families; and 
 preservice development for 30,000 math and science professionals who will become adjunct high school teachers.

The ACI was signed into law in 2007 and has since been replaced by the America COMPETES Act. The cutoff date for grants appropriated and funded by this bill was December 31, 2008.

References

External links
 The ACI Press Briefing held on February 1, 2006
 ACI Booklet from the Office of Science and Technology Policy (OSTP)

Economy of the United States
United States Department of Education
Federal assistance in the United States
Learning programs
Scientific research foundations in the United States
Grants (money)
Research institutes in the United States